Ong Eng Guan (1925–2008) was a Singaporean politician who served as Minister for National Development between 1959 and 1960. An anti-communist, Ong was a Chinese-educated orator who became popular among the Chinese community in Singapore. He was also one of the pioneering members of the governing People's Action Party (PAP). He was elected into the City Council of Singapore and became the first and only elected mayor in Singapore's history after the 1957 City Council election.

Political career 
Ong's anti-colonial stance shocked the British government and every City Council meetings then were considered entertainment for the spectators there. Ong continued to run the City Council from December 1957 till April 1959 when he resigned to contest in the first fully elected Legislative Assembly. 

The PAP gained control of the Legislative Assembly in 1959 after the elections. The PAP's victory reportedly created a dilemma within the 12-member Central Executive Committee of the PAP as there was no formal process in place to choose a prime minister-elect. A vote was purportedly held between Lee Kuan Yew and Ong and after both men received six votes, party chairman Toh Chin Chye cast the tie-breaking vote for Lee. When interviewed nearly five decades later, Toh and one other party member recalled the vote, but Lee and several others denied the account.

Ong was subsequently appointed Singapore's first ever National Development Minister. Ong was unhappy with Lee and his cabinet for a variety of issues, including the abolition of the City Council. 

In June 1960, Ong tabled 16 resolutions to the Central Executive Committee that challenged the party leadership, after which he was sacked from the cabinet and expelled from the PAP. 

In 1961, Ong resigned from the Legislative Assembly, forcing the government to hold by-election for his vacated seat. He then stood as an independent in the by-election and won the seat due to his popularity in the Chinese community. He defeated PAP candidate Jek Yeun Thong, who had the support of the PAP leaders who actively campaigned for him. 

During the 1963 elections, Ong formed the United People's Party to contest the elections but won only one out of 46 seats the party contested, which was won by Ong himself. He then later quit the Assembly and retired from public life in June 1965 citing infrequent sitting of the Legislative Assembly as the reason.

Death 
Ong died in 2008 at the age of 83.

References

Works cited

External links 
Biography of Ong Eng Guan

People's Action Party politicians
Singaporean anti-communists
Singaporean people of Hokkien descent
United People's Party (Singapore) politicians
1925 births
2008 deaths
Members of the Legislative Assembly of Singapore
Singaporean independence activists